Wirthiotrema is a genus of lichen-forming fungi in the family Graphidaceae. The genus was circumscribed in 2010 by Eimy Rivas Plata, Klaus Kalb, Andreas Frisch, and H. Thorsten Lumbsch, with Wirthiotrema glaucopallens assigned as the type species. Wirthiotrema contains species that were formerly considered part of the Thelotrema glaucopallens species group. The genus name honours lichenologist Volkmar Wirth, "for his numerous outstanding contributions to lichenology".

Characteristics of genus Wirthiotrema include thalli and apothecia that similar to those in genus Myriotrema, in combination with a paraplectenchymatous excipulum (i.e., made of a fungal tissue with a cellular structure superficially like parenchyma of vascular plants), ascospores that are non-reactive with iodine-based stains, and the presence of stictic acid as a major secondary compound. Other compounds present in minor amounts include acetylconstictic acid, constictic acid, and consalazinic acid; lichexanthone occurs in W. xanthopustulatum.

Wirthiotrema has a pantropical distribution and usually is found in lowland to lower montane forests, where it grows on bark.

Species
Wirthiotrema desquamans 
Wirthiotrema duplomarginatum 
Wirthiotrema glaucopallens 
Wirthiotrema santessonii 
Wirthiotrema trypaneoides 
Wirthiotrema xanthopustulatum  – Brazil

References

Graphidaceae
Lichen genera
Taxa described in 2010
Ostropales genera
Taxa named by Helge Thorsten Lumbsch
Taxa named by Klaus Kalb